"(Can't Get My) Head Around You" is a punk rock song by The Offspring. The song features as the sixth track of the band's seventh studio album, Splinter (2003), and was released as its second single in 2004. "(Can't Get My) Head Around You" was released to radio on February 24, 2004. The song also appears as the 14th and final track on the band's Greatest Hits (2005).

Track listing

Limited edition 7" picture disc

Japan CD maxi

Promo CD

Music video
A music video was released in support of the single. The video clip features the band playing in a dome lit by fluorescent lights and was shot with over 125 cameras, in what the band's website calls 'the ultimate performance video'.  The video was directed by Joseph Kahn, with Chris Watts supervising the visual effects and the multicamera system.

This is the first music video from The Offspring to show Atom Willard playing the drums.

The music video appears on the Complete Music Video Collection DVD, released in 2005.

Charts

References

The Offspring songs
2004 singles
Music videos directed by Joseph Kahn
Songs written by Dexter Holland
Song recordings produced by Brendan O'Brien (record producer)
2003 songs
Columbia Records singles